The Closer is an American television police procedural starring Kyra Sedgwick as Brenda Leigh Johnson, a Los Angeles Police Department deputy chief. A CIA-trained interrogator originally from Atlanta, Georgia, Brenda has a reputation as a closer—an interrogator who not only solves a case, but also obtains confessions that lead to convictions, thus "closing" the case. She sometimes uses deceit and intimidation to persuade a suspect to confess. The series ran on TNT from June 13, 2005 to August 13, 2012.

The Closer was created by James Duff and the Shephard/Robin Company in association with Warner Bros. Television.  On July 11, 2011, the series began its seventh and final season, having finished its sixth season as cable's highest-rated drama. The Closers final six episodes began airing on July 9, 2012, with its finale airing on August 13, 2012. Following the finale, The Closers spin-off, Major Crimes, premiered.

Episodes

Each episode of The Closer deals with an aspect of the Los Angeles culture as it interfaces with law enforcement in the megacity. The show deals with complex and subtle issues of public policy, ethics, personal integrity, and questions of good and evil. The rather large character ensemble explores the human condition, touching on individual faiths, traditional religious influences in the lives and communities of contemporary society, and the breakdown and dysfunction of family systems, work teaming, and government responsibility. The first season began with Brenda Leigh Johnson arriving at the LAPD to lead the Priority Murder Squad (PMS), quickly renamed Priority Homicide Division (PHD), a team that originally dealt solely with high-profile murder cases (seasons one to four).

During season four, an embarrassing tangle with the press over just what criteria make a homicide a priority allowed Brenda to manipulate circumstances so that the division was upgraded to a much larger major crimes division with a wider scope, though most plots still focused on homicides. Most importantly to the show's plotlines, Commander Taylor's role was also changed from "rival and in-house adversary" to that of "unambiguously loyal subordinate", so he was thereafter reporting directly to Brenda and noticeably helpful as he coordinated interaction between the MCD and other units.

Season five introduced Mary McDonnell as Captain Sharon Raydor of the Force Investigations Division. Raydor and Brenda start out as rivals, but gradually develop grudging respect for each other and form an uneasy alliance. McDonnell went on to star in The Closers spin-off, Major Crimes.

During the final season, Brenda finds herself in civil legal difficulties as a result of the events in "War Zone" (season six, episode eight), and the LAPD concludes that a disloyal subordinate must be generating information leaks from within MCD. Taylor and Raydor take an active role in attempting to combat the leaker, and the legal matters do not reach a final resolution until the series' end, in the episode "The Last Word".

On December 10, 2010, TNT announced that the seventh season of The Closer, which began production in the spring of 2011, would be the last. The channel said that the decision to retire the show was made by Sedgwick. On January 30, 2011, it was announced that the final season would add six episodes to the usual 15-episode order, building toward the spin-off series, Major Crimes.

Characters

The cast consists largely of an ensemble of detectives who make up the LAPD's fictional Major Crimes Division. It is led by Deputy Chief Brenda Leigh Johnson, played by Kyra Sedgwick. Some observers have noted strong similarities between Brenda and Jane Tennison, Helen Mirren's lead character in the British crime drama Prime Suspect, with an article in USA Today claiming The Closer to be "an unofficial Americanization" of the British drama.  In interviews, Sedgwick has acknowledged that the show owes "a debt" to Prime Suspect and her admiration for that show and Mirren were factors that first interested her in the role.

Other main characters include Brenda's superior officer, Assistant Chief Will Pope (J. K. Simmons), Robbery-Homicide Division Commander Russell Taylor (Robert Gossett), and her FBI agent boyfriend-then-husband Fritz Howard (Jon Tenney). The remainder of the cast makes up Brenda's squad, each with expertise in a specific area, such as crime-scene investigation or gang activity. The first and only departure from the regular cast occurred in season five, when actress Gina Ravera left and her character, Detective Irene Daniels, was transferred to another division.

Mary McDonnell, a recurring cast member in seasons five and six, joined the cast full-time for season seven, continuing her role as Captain Sharon Raydor.

Main cast and characters 
 Kyra Sedgwick as Brenda Leigh Johnson, Los Angeles Police Department (LAPD) deputy chief, Major Crimes Division.  Originally a CIA-trained police detective from Atlanta, Georgia, she is the interrogation specialist Will Pope calls a "closer".
 J. K. Simmons as Will Pope, LAPD assistant chief for operations, acting chief of police during season six and interim chief of police during season seven.
 Corey Reynolds as David Gabriel, LAPD sergeant, is a laterally appointed detective sergeant from season five onward.
 Robert Gossett as Russell Taylor, LAPD captain, is initially assigned to Robbery-Homicide Division, promoted to commander in season two, and appointed LAPD interdepartmental liaison in season four. 
 G. W. Bailey as Louie Provenza, LAPD detective lieutenant, is second-in-command of MCD. 
 Tony Denison as Andy Flynn, LAPD detective lieutenant, is transferred from Robbery-Homicide to MCD during season one.
 Jon Tenney as Fritz Howard, Senior Special Agent of the Federal Bureau of Investigation, is the FBI-LAPD liaison from season six onwards.
 Michael Paul Chan as Michael Tao, LAPD detective lieutenant, is the scientific investigation specialist (regular: seasons 3–7; recurring: seasons 1–2)
 Raymond Cruz as Julio Sanchez, LAPD detective, is the guns and gangs specialist (regular: seasons 3–7; recurring: seasons 1–2)
 Gina Ravera as Irene Daniels, LAPD detective, is the forensic accounting specialist (regular: seasons 3–4; recurring: seasons 1–2)
 Phillip P. Keene as Buzz Watson, LAPD civilian surveillance coordinator, handles video and audio tasks. (regular: seasons 4–7; recurring: seasons 1–3)
 Mary McDonnell as Sharon Raydor, LAPD captain, Force Investigation Division, is also Women's Coordinator for the LAPD (regular: season 7; recurring: seasons 5–6)

Cultural impact
Both gender researchers and members of the media have claimed that the series "expanded the vocabulary of what is acceptable for women as seen through the lens of popular culture."

"We've certainly seen women in powerful positions before," says author and gender researcher Maddy Dychtwald, pointing out Angie Dickinson in 1974's Police Woman, and Cagney & Lacey from 1981. "But those women were largely token in a sea of dominant males, and most important, strove to be like the men that surrounded them." In contrast, Dychtwald says the former CIA-trained interrogator and Atlanta police detective played by Kyra Sedgwick, "retains (and revels in) her femininity, keeps her composure, can handle the two 'sexist pigs' who bait her due to their jealousy and insecurities, and not lose her head."

Media experts also noted that the series helped redefine the place of basic cable channels alongside network programming:

Beyond gently tweaking the popular image of women in power, "The Closer" has helped redefine the power balance between basic cable and broadcast networks, says Fordham University media expert Paul Levinson. Just glance at the equal number of recent Emmy nominations for basic and premium cable shows is confirmation, he adds. Beyond that, says More Magazine Entertainment Director Kathy Heintzelman, the off-season placement—the show launched in the summer and continues to air its seasons in counterbalance to the traditional network schedule—has helped redefine viewing habits. "It's helped people get used to the idea that summer is a time to watch original series on televisions," she adds.

U.S. television ratings
The Closer's debut was viewed by more than 7 million viewers according to Nielsen Media Research and was the top-rated premiere episode ever of any original scripted series on basic cable. The second- (8.28) and third-season (8.81) premieres broke the previous record. Viewer numbers (based on average total viewers per episode) of The Closer on TNT:

At the end of season three, The Closer became ad-supported cable's most-viewed scripted series of all time, ending the season with a live + same-day audience of 9.21 million viewers in 6.84 million households. The third-season finale holds the record for the largest live + 7-day audience for a single episode of an ad-supported cable series with 9.55 million viewers in 6.88 million households.  Live + 7 day (DVR) data for the season reflect 30–40% audience growth in three key age-based demographic groups. Season four's premiere slipped slightly from the season-three opening, with live + same-day ratings showing a 3% decline in audience from the previous year's opener. For its Season Six premiere, on July 12, 2010, the show reached an estimated 7.66 million viewers.

Home media
Warner Home Video has released all seven seasons of The Closer on DVD in Region 1.

Awards and accolades
Until the Primetime Emmy Awards in 2011, Kyra Sedgwick had made history as being the only actress in the history of television to be nominated for an Emmy, Golden Globe, and Screen Actors Guild award every year that the show aired in the eligibility period.

Syndication and streaming
The Closer is currently airing reruns on Lifetime, Start TV, and TNT. It's also available to stream on WarnerMedia's HBO Max, which launched on May 27, 2020. MyNetworkTV acquired the broadcast syndication rights to the series, premiering on September 30, 2015.

International distribution

Latin America: Space, TNT Series
: TVSH
: Nine Network, GEM, Seven Network
: ORF, ATV
: 2BE, VIJF, 13th Street
: SBT, TNT Séries
: Nova Television (Seasons one-three)(new season sx), Diema 2 (season four-present), Fox Crime (repeats), Studio Universal
 English: Super Channel
 French: Séries+
: HRT 2
: Kanal 4
: Kanal 2
: MTV3, AXN Crime
: TVNorge
: France 2, Diva, Universal Channel 
: Georgian Public Broadcaster
: VOX, WarnerTV Serie
: Star Channel, Hallmark Channel 
: ViuTVsix
: RTL Klub, VIASAT3
: Channel 6 now 3e/TV3
: Yes Action
: Universal Channel, AXN, Mediaset Premium (pay); Italia 1, Rete 4 (free)
: LaLa TV
: BTV
: NET 5, 13th Street
: TV One
: Jack City
: TVP2, 13th Street Universal Poland
: Fox Crime 
: DTV, Diva Universal
: WarnerTV
: WarnerTV
: TV Avala 
: Kanal A (Seasons 1–4), POP Brio (season five–present)
: Calle 13, Cuatro, FDF, Divinity
: TV3, 13th Street
: RTS Un, RSI La 1
: CNBC-e, AXN
: FOX UK, More4, 13th Street 
: Canal 10
: M-Net

Notes

References

External links

 

2005 American television series debuts
2012 American television series endings
2000s American crime drama television series
2000s American mystery television series
2000s American police procedural television series
2000s American workplace drama television series
2010s American crime drama television series
2010s American mystery television series
2010s American police procedural television series
2010s American workplace drama television series
American detective television series
English-language television shows
Fictional portrayals of the Los Angeles Police Department
Primetime Emmy Award-winning television series
Television series by Warner Bros. Television Studios
Television shows set in Los Angeles
TNT (American TV network) original programming